Night Call was a weekly call-in show hosted by Molly Lambert, Tess Lynch, and Emily Yoshida. In addition to free weekly podcasts on the iHeartRadio platform, Night Call hosted lives shows on Twitch.tv and in person, and created book club themed episodes, movie club themed episodes, and monthly mixes for their Patreon supporters.

Previous collaborations
The three first worked together on the Girls in Hoodies podcast at Grantland through 2014, a podcast that "dared to challenge its listeners".

Reception
Night Call held a 4.5-star rating on Apple Podcasts and received positive reviews from outlets such as The Maine Campus, TIME, Pacific Standard, Vulture.com, and ELLE.

References

Audio podcasts
2018 podcast debuts
2020 podcast endings